Sergei Chukhray (born May 31, 1955 in Belogorsk, Amur Oblast) is a Soviet sprint canoeist who competed from the mid-1970s to the early 1980s. Competing in two Summer Olympics, he won three gold medals with one in 1976 (K-4 1000 m) and two in 1980 (K-2 500 m, K-2 1000 m).

Chukhray also won nine medals at the ICF Canoe Sprint World Championships with three golds (K-2 500 m: 1979, K-2 1000 m: 1978, K-4 10000 m: 1982), three silvers (K-1 4 x 500 m: 1974, K-4 500 m: 1979, 1983), and three bronzes (K-2 500 m: 1978, K-2 1000 m: 1979, K-4 1000 m: 1983).

References

External links
 
 

1955 births
Living people
People from Belogorsk, Amur Oblast
Russian male canoeists
Soviet male canoeists
Canoeists at the 1976 Summer Olympics
Canoeists at the 1980 Summer Olympics
Olympic canoeists of the Soviet Union
Olympic gold medalists for the Soviet Union
Olympic medalists in canoeing
ICF Canoe Sprint World Championships medalists in kayak
Medalists at the 1980 Summer Olympics
Medalists at the 1976 Summer Olympics
Sportspeople from Amur Oblast
Recipients of the Honorary Diploma of the Cabinet of Ministers of Ukraine